Lake Ngaroto is a peat lake in Waipa District of New Zealand.

The lake is hypertrophic, leading to eutrophication. It has very high levels of nutrients, microscopic algae and suspended sediment and its water clarity is low and decreasing by around  a year. A health warning was issued in 2020 for cyanobacteria.

The New Zealand Ministry for Culture and Heritage gives a translation of "the lakes" for Ngāroto.

History
The Battle of Hingakaka was fought nearby, and the sacred carving Te Uenuku lost at this time. It was re-discovered in 1906, and now resides in the Te Awamutu Museum.

Recreation
 Power boats are banned from the lake, so Lake Ngaroto is popular for sailing and rowing.
 During the New Zealand Duck Shooting Season (May and June), the lake is used for duck shooting.
 Waipa District council has constructed a 6km track around the lake, part gravel and part boardwalk. It is popular with walkers and runners and recreational cyclists. There are several public toilets.

See also 
Ngaroto railway station

References

External links
Lake Ngaroto at Lake Ecosystem Restoration New Zealand

Ngaroto
Waipa District